The 2009 CAF Champions League is the 45th edition of Africa's premier club football tournament organized by the Confederation of African Football (CAF), and the 13th edition under the current CAF Champions League format.  The winner will participate in the 2009 FIFA Club World Cup and the 2010 CAF Super Cup.

Qualification
 53 teams from 40 CAF member associations were entered officially in the 2009 CAF Champions League.
 The 12 highest ranked associations according to CAF 5-Year Ranking are eligible to enter 2 teams in the competition. For this year's competition, CAF used 2003–07 5-Year rankings in which 3 countries shared the 12th place – allowing 14 countries to enter a second team.
 Two other teams were entered after the official deadline and were placed in a special subsection on the draw.

Below is the qualification scheme for the competition.  Nations are shown according to their CAF 5-Year Ranking – those with a ranking score have their rank and score indicated:

Italicised clubs withdrew without playing.
Bolded clubs received a bye in the preliminary round, entering the tournament in the first round.
Unranked associations have no ranking points and hence are equal 23rd (Malawi – ranked =18th – did not enter a champion this year).

1 The champions of Congo DR, South Africa, Sudan, and Tunisia were not given byes in the first stage although the runners-up were.  Unlike European tournaments, seeding within the CAF draws is based on performance in continental tournaments only.
2 The 2007–08 Egyptian Premier League runner-up, Ismaily opted not to enter this competition, choosing instead to play in the 2008–09 Arab Champions League.  The third-placed Egyptian side, Al-Zamalek were not allowed to replace them as the CAF Champions League regulations allow only national champions and runners-up to compete.
3 2008 Réunion Premier League Champion, JS Saint-Pierroise, banned from African club competitions after withdrawing from the 2007 CAF Champions League.

Qualifying rounds

Preliminary round

The preliminary round first legs were played on 30 January – 1 February, and the second legs on 13–15 February 2009.

|}

1 Played over one leg after first leg cancelled due to political violence in Madagascar

Dispensation round
Two federations inscribed their clubs after the deadline, but were admitted for an intermediate round.  However, the winning club could only gain access to the first round if another winning club from the preliminary round withdrew subsequently.  The first leg was played on 22 February, and the second leg on 8 March 2009.

|}

As no side withdrew from the first round, Akonangui were effectively eliminated as well.

First round
The first round first legs were played on 13–15 March, and the second legs on 3–6 April 2009.

|}

Second round
The first leg will be on 17–19 April and the second leg on 1–3 May.

|}

 The losing teams from the second round advance to the CAF Confederation Cup 2009

Group stage

The draw for the group stage was held on 7 May in CAF headquarters in Cairo.

Étoile du Sahel and Al-Merreikh were seeded as level I, while TP Mazembe and Al-Hilal were seeded as level II.

Group A

Group B

Knockout stage

Bracket

Semifinals
The first legs were scheduled for 4 October and the second legs for 17–18 October.

|}

Final

2–2 on aggregate. TP Mazembe won on the away goals rule.

Leading goal scorers

Last updated 2 August

Notes
 List of players and teams (1/16th finals): Champions League

References

External links
Official Site
Official MTN CAF Champions League Website

 
2009
1